Mons La Hire is a solitary lunar mountain in the western Mare Imbrium. It is located to the northeast of the crater Euler, and to the west-northwest of Lambert.

The selenographic coordinates of this feature are 27.8° N, 25.5° W, and it has a maximum diameter at the base of 25 km. The mountain base has a shape roughly like an arrow head, with the point oriented toward the west-northwest. The peak has a height of 1.5 km above the surface.

This feature was named after Philippe de La Hire, a French mathematician and astronomer.

Nearby craters

Several tiny craters near this mountain have been assigned names by the IAU. These are listed in the table below. Felix and Verne are located to the south of the peak, while the remainder are grouped to the north and northeast.

Satellite craters
By convention these features are identified on lunar maps by placing the letter on the side of the crater midpoint that is closest to Mons La Hire.

La Hire A is on the northeast side of Dorsum Zirkel, and La Hire B is on the southwest side.

The following craters have been renamed by the IAU.
 La Hire D — See Caventou (crater).

See also
 List of mountains on the Moon by height

References

External links

 

Mountains on the Moon
Hire, Mons La